Pershotravensk is a city and municipality in Synelnykove Raion, Dnipropetrovsk Oblast (province) of Ukraine. Population:

History 
Until May 1960 it was known as a town Shakhtarske. City since February 1966.

In 1974 the population was 23.6 thousand people.

In January 1989 the population was 28 068 people

In January 2013 the population was 29 019 people.

Until 18 July 2020, Pershotravensk was incorporated as a city of oblast significance. In July 2020, as part of the administrative reform of Ukraine, which reduced the number of raions of Dnipropetrovsk Oblast to seven, the city of Pershotravensk was merged into Synelnykove Raion.

Notable people
Oleksandr Kubrakov — economist, civil servant, politician
Yaroslav Rakitskyi — footballer

References

Cities in Dnipropetrovsk Oblast
Cities of regional significance in Ukraine
Populated places established in the Ukrainian Soviet Socialist Republic